This Is Africa is an English-language bi-monthly business publication owned by The Financial Times Ltd and edited in London. It examines African business and politics in a global context and seeks to make sense of the relationships that Africa is building with the rest of the world. It aims to challenge international preconceptions about the continent and to identify the opportunities and the risks in this dynamic business environment.

This Is Africa investigates foreign policy towards Africa, tracks the rise of the African consumer and identifies investment opportunities in Africa. Adrienne Klasa was one of the editors of the magazine.

According to the magazine’s 2013 media pack, the readership circulation by job description is 25% Senior Government Officials, 24% Consultants and Intermediaries, 20% C-Suite, 20% Director of Policy and 11% Institutional Investors, while the regional readership breakdown is 25% Africa, 24% Americas, 23% Europe, 18% Asia and 10% Middle East.

Features
This Is Africa focuses primarily on FDI business and political developments that impact on how Africa interacts with the wider world. It has regular sections on:

References

External links
homepage of This Is Africa
FT Business group homepage highlighting individual magazine information

Bi-monthly magazines published in the United Kingdom
Business magazines published in the United Kingdom
News magazines published in the United Kingdom
Financial Times
Magazines published in London
Magazines with year of establishment missing